Biofact may refer to:

Biofact (archaeology)
Biofact (biology)
Biofact (philosophy)